Han Jin-su (born 16 December 1965) is a South Korean field hockey player. He competed in the men's tournament at the 1988 Summer Olympics.

References

External links
 

1965 births
Living people
South Korean male field hockey players
Olympic field hockey players of South Korea
Field hockey players at the 1988 Summer Olympics
Field hockey players from Seoul
Asian Games medalists in field hockey
Asian Games gold medalists for South Korea
Medalists at the 1986 Asian Games
Field hockey players at the 1986 Asian Games
20th-century South Korean people
21st-century South Korean people